is a Japanese football player. She plays for Albirex Niigata. She played for Japan national team.

Club career
Kitagawa was born in Kanazawa on May 10, 1997. After graduating from JFA Academy Fukushima, she joined Urawa Reds in 2015. She played as regular right side back from first season. However her opportunity to play decreased from 2017. In September 2018, she moved to Albirex Niigata.

National team career
Kitagawa played for Japan U-17 national team at 2014 U-17 World Cup and Japan U-20 national team at 2016 U-20 World Cup. Japan won the championship in 2014 and took third place in 2016. In 2017, she was selected by the Japan national team for the 2017 Algarve Cup. On March 1, she played against Spain. She played five games for Japan in 2017.

National team statistics

References

External links

Japan Football Association

1997 births
Living people
People from Kanazawa, Ishikawa
Waseda University alumni
Association football people from Ishikawa Prefecture
Japanese women's footballers
Japan women's international footballers
Nadeshiko League players
Urawa Red Diamonds Ladies players
Albirex Niigata Ladies players
Women's association football defenders